City Centre Alexandria   is located in Alexandria, Egypt, where it opened on 23 January 2003. It was developed and is managed by Majid Al Futtaim Properties. Home to over 160 retail stores, Alexandria City Centre has a gross trading area of 60,370 square meters including anchor stores such as Debenhams, Zara, Max and H&M and 14,771 square meter Carrefour Hypermarket.

Dining 

City Centre Alexandria houses over 25 restaurants and cafes, including an international food court which was revamped in summer 2013 to include over 10 outlets.

Entertainment 

Magic Planet
Magic Planet is a popular family entertainment centre in the Middle East. It features the latest award-winning simulators, video games and amusement rides for children.

 VOX Cinemas

Renaissance Cinema at City Centre Alexandria is a seven-screen cinema multiplex with state-of-the-art digital and 3D projection systems.

Events 

City Centre Alexandria  has an active community engagement program. The mall regularly invites a number of charitable and social organizations into the mall to raise money or awareness for a variety of causes. Such organizations include American Heart Association and Technokids Egypt.

References

External links 
City Centre Alexandria - Official Website

Shopping malls in Egypt